The Hispanic Interest Coalition of Alabama (¡HICA!) is a non-profit organization, created in 1999, which aims to improve the quality of life for Latinos living in Alabama.

HICA was founded by Isabel Rubio.

References

External links
 Hispanic Interest Coalition of Alabama

Hispanic and Latino American culture in Alabama
Hispanic and Latino American organizations
Non-profit organizations based in Alabama